161 (one hundred [and] sixty-one) is the natural number following 160 and preceding 162.

In mathematics
 161 is the sum of five consecutive prime numbers: 23, 29, 31, 37, and 41
 161 is a hexagonal pyramidal number.
 161 is a semiprime. Since its prime factors 7 and 23 are both Gaussian primes, 161 is a Blum integer.
 161 is a palindromic number
  is a commonly used rational approximation of the square root of 5 and is the closest fraction with denominator <300 to that number.

In the military
  was a U.S. Navy Type T2 tanker during World War II
  was a U.S. Navy  during World War II
  was a U.S. Navy Trefoil-class concrete barge during World War II
  was a U.S. Navy  during World War II
  was a U.S. Navy  during World War II
  was a U.S. Navy  during World War II
  was a U.S. Navy wooden yacht during World War I
  was a U.S. Navy  during World War II
  was a U.S. Navy Achomawi-class fleet ocean tug following World War II
  was a U.S. Navy fourth-group S-class submarine between 1920 and 1931
  is a fictional U.S. Navy diesel engine submarine featured in the 1996 film Down Periscope
 The 161st Intelligence Squadron unit of the Kansas Air National Guard. Its parent unit is the 184th Intelligence Wing

In music
 The Bose 161 Speaker System (2001)
 The Kay K-161 ThinTwin guitar

In transportation
 MTA Maryland commuter bus 161
 New Jersey Bus Route 161
 London Bus route 161

In other fields
161 is also:
 The year AD 161 or 161 BC
 161 AH is a year in the Islamic calendar that corresponds to 777 – 778 CE
 161 Athor is an M-type Main belt asteroid
 E.161 is an ITU-T assigns letters to the 12-key telephone keypad
 Fiorina Fury 161 is a foundry facility and penal colony from the film Alien 3
 161 is used by Anti Fascist Action as a code for AFA (A=1, F=6, by order of the alphabet), sometimes used in 161>88 (88 is code for Heil Hitler among neo-nazis, as H=8)

See also
 Anti-Fascist Action
 List of highways numbered 161
 United Nations Security Council Resolution 161
 United States Supreme Court cases, Volume 161

External links

 Number Facts and Trivia: 161
 The Number 161
 VirtueScience: 161

References 

Integers